Reinventing Anarchy: What Are Anarchists Thinking These Days? is a 1979 anthology of essays about anarchism edited by Howard Ehrlich, Carol Ehrlich, David de Leon, and Glenda Morris.

A review by historian Paul Avrich notes that while the editors claim to synthesize a new view of anarchism, in practice the anthology retreads old concepts, and excludes international perspectives, economics and education, and individualist anarchism.

References

Bibliography 

 
 
 
 
 
 
 
 
 

1979 non-fiction books
1979 anthologies
English-language books
Essay anthologies
Books about anarchism
Routledge books